Sarap at Home is a Philippine television cooking show broadcast by QTV and GMA News TV. Hosted by Sam Oh and Niño Logarta, it premiered on October 24, 2009. The show concluded in 2012.

References

2009 Philippine television series debuts
2012 Philippine television series endings
Filipino-language television shows
GMA News TV original programming
Philippine cooking television series
Q (TV network) original programming